Domenico Ridola (19 October 1841, in Ferrandina – 11 June 1932, in Matera) was an Italian physician, politician and archaeologist.

Early life 
Ridola was born to Gregorio Ridola and noblewoman Camilla de Gemmis of Terlizzi. In 1865, he graduated in Medicine from the University of Naples Federico II, and then continued his studies in Italy and abroad.

Career 
He opened a private practice in his home-town, Matera. In 1872 he discovered a new pediatric disease, called "sindrome del Ridola", a particular sublingual neoformation.

Ridola was mayor of Matera and a provincial councillor for many years. He was nominated for the Council of Matera after the premature death of Michele Torraca in 1906. He was re-elected in 1909, defeating Nicola De Ruggieri. In 1913, at age 72, he was elected Senator at the Parliament of Regno d'Italia.

Ridola was a keen archaeologist, making many excavations around Matera and Murge. His discoveries included material dating to the Paleolithic era, in particular in the Grotta dei pipistrelli. He unearthed villages of the Neolithic era, an ancient necropolis and a prosperous stips votiva in Timmari, the neolithic site of Serra d'Alto and some tombs belonging to the Age of metals. In 1911, Ridola donated his discoveries to the State, now conserved in a museum dedicated to his memory, the Museo archeologico nazionale Domenico Ridola.

Ridola was a member of the Istituto Archeologico Germanico, of the Accademia Francese di Archeologia, of the Accademia Pontaniana and of the Società Magna Grecia. He was nominated as the inspector of ancient monuments in Matera.

Ridola died in 1932 in Matera and is buried in the Cimitero vecchio with his brother Leonardo.

Publications
 Un'efficace metodo di cura in talune forme gravi d'isterismo, 1889
 Caso di sanguisuga in trachea, 1894
 Avanzi di stazione preistorica e necropoli ad incinerazione scoperta a Monte Timmari presso Matera, 1900
 La paletnologia nel Materano, 1901
 Quagliati Quintino - Necropoli arcaica ad incinerazione presso Timmari nel materano, 1906
 Le origini di Matera, 1906
 Per la Lucania Antica (Discorso inaugurale della nuova sede del Museo archeologico nazionale della Basilicata), 6 September 1907
 Brevi note sulla stazione preistorica della Grotta dei Pipistrelli e della vicina grotta Funeraria, 1912
 Villaggi trincerati preistorici nel Materano, 1924
 Le grandi trincee preistoriche di Matera : la ceramica e la civiltà di quel tempo, 1926

References

 Il centenario del Museo Ridola di Matera 1911-2011 by Giorgio Mellucci, Naples: Archeologiattiva
 Lucani in Parlamento. Repertorio di deputati e senatori lucani (1861-1961), by Michele Strazza, Venosa (PZ), EdiMaior, 2010.

External links
 Places and memories related to Domenico Ridola

1841 births
1932 deaths
Italian general practitioners
People from the Province of Matera
University of Naples Federico II alumni